is a Japanese international rugby union player who plays as a prop.

Club career

A late bloomer, Yamaji joined the Canon Eagles ahead of the 2012 Top League season.   For the first four years of his career with the Eagles, he was largely a bit part player making substitute appearances, however in 2016 he finally established himself as a regular in the starting XV.

International

At the age of 31, Yamaji received his first call-up to Japan's senior squad ahead of the 2016 end-of-year rugby union internationals.

References

1985 births
Living people
Japanese rugby union players
Japan international rugby union players
Rugby union props
Kanagawa University alumni
Yokohama Canon Eagles players
Sportspeople from Tokyo
Sunwolves players